Bulldog Drummond is a fictional gentleman adventurer created by H. C. McNeile.

Bulldog Drummond may also refer to:
 Bulldog Drummond (novel), a 1920 novel by McNeile under the pen name Sapper
 Bulldog Drummond (play), a 1921 play co-written by McNeile and Gerald du Maurier 
 Bulldog Drummond (1922 film), a British adaptation of the novel starring Carlyle Blackwell and directed by Oscar Apfel
 Bulldog Drummond (1929 film), an American crime drama starring Ronald Colman and directed by F. Richard Jones
 Bulldog Drummond (radio program), an American series broadcast from 1941 to 1954